The Ashland branch, formerly known as the Englewood branch, is a  long branch of the Chicago "L" currently operated as the Green Line, serving the Englewood and West Englewood neighborhoods of Chicago, Illinois.

History
The first station on the Ashland branch, State, opened November 3, 1905. After an incremental series of expansions, service was extended to the branch's first terminal at Loomis on July 13, 1907. On May 6, 1969, the Ashland/63rd terminal opened, replacing the old terminal at Loomis. On January 9, 1994, the Green Line closed for renovation. When the line reopened on May 12, 1996, the Englewood branch was renamed the Ashland branch.

Station listing

References

Chicago Transit Authority
Railway lines in Chicago
Railway lines opened in 1905
Standard gauge railways in the United States
1905 establishments in Illinois